The Girl Spy: An Incident of the Civil War is a 1909 American silent film produced by Kalem Company and directed by Sidney Olcott with Gene Gauntier in the leading role. A story of the Civil War.

Production notes
The film was shot in Jacksonville, Florida.

A copy is kept in the Library and Archives of Canada (Ottawa).

Bibliography
 The Moving Picture World, Vol 4 n°20, May 15, 1909, p 623, p 643, p 672.
 The New York Dramatic Mirror, May 29, 1909, p 17.
 Supplement to the Bioscope, July 18, 1912, p. XVII.

References

External links
 AFI Catalog

 The Girl Spy: An Incident of the Civil War website dedicated to Sidney Olcott

1909 films
1909 drama films
1909 short films
American black-and-white films
American silent short films
Films directed by Sidney Olcott
Films set in Florida
Films shot in Jacksonville, Florida
Silent American drama films
American Civil War films
1900s American films